Geometry of Love is the fifteenth studio album by French electronic musician and composer Jean-Michel Jarre, released by Warner Music in October 2003.

This album has more in common with the preceding Sessions 2000 album than releases prior, but the style here is still more electronica than jazz. The music was to be lounge music, played in the background or in the chill-out area of a club. The album was commissioned by Jean-Roch, as a soundtrack for his 'VIP Room' nightclub in France. The CD was initially meant to come out in only 2000 copies. However, it was later released as a generally available CD. The physical CD was a long time out of print (available only in digital download format), but in 2018 remastered reissue was released on CD again.

The album cover is a pixelated and turned counter-clockwise photo of the pubis of Isabelle Adjani, Jarre's girlfriend at the time.

The track "Velvet Road" is a remake of the unreleased composition "Children of Space" created by Jarre for the "Rendez-Vous in Space" concert in Okinawa, in 2001. Some of the sounds in Geometry of Love were used earlier on Interior Music released in 2001. Several tracks from Geometry of Love were included on Jarre's 2006 compilation release Sublime Mix.

Track listing

Equipment
 Roland XP-80
 Eminent 310U
 ARP 2600
 Minimoog
 Korg KARMA
 Novation Digital Music Systems Supernova II
 microKORG
 Roland JP-8000
 Korg Mini Pops 7
 Digisequencer
 E-mu Systems XL7
 Roland HandSonic
 EMS Synthi AKS
 EMS VCS 3
 RMI Harmonic Synthesizer
 Pro Tools

References 
Notes

External links 
 Geometry of Love at Discogs

2003 albums
Jean-Michel Jarre albums
Lounge music albums